Donald Knowles was a rugby union player who turned professional to play rugby league for Castleford (Heritage № 125) in 1932. He later played briefly for Newcastle, and then played association football for Hertford Town.

Playing career
Aged 22 at the time of switching codes, he had previously played rugby union for Huddersfield College and York St John's College.

Knowles made his rugby league début in the match between Castleford and Hull F.C. on 17 December 1932. During his first season at Castleford, the club won the Yorkshire County League. During February 1934, he was granted his request to be listed for transfer, with the fee being set at £150. He was still at the club during November 1935, when it was announced that he was soon to leave to take up a teaching appointment in Blaydon-on-Tyne. At that time he was deputising for the injured Ted Sadler.

Personal
The engagement of Knowles, who was a second son, to Greta Lamb of Castleford was announced during December, prior to him leaving the club. The marriage took place at Whitwood Mere Parish Church during May 1937, at which time his parents were living in Scarborough. He had played rugby league briefly for Newcastle while teaching in County Durham, and by the time of his wedding was teaching in Hertfordshire, where he was also playing association football as a centre-half with Hertford Town in the Spartan League.

See also
List of Castleford Tigers players

References

Association football central defenders
Castleford R.U.F.C. players
Castleford Tigers players
English footballers
English rugby league players
English rugby union players
Hertford Town F.C. players
Newcastle RLFC players
Place of birth missing
Place of death missing
Rugby league centres
Rugby league locks
Rugby league second-rows
Rugby league wingers
Year of birth missing
Year of death missing